The Blue Lagoon is a 1949 British coming-of-age romance and adventure film directed and co-produced by Frank Launder (with Sidney Gilliat) and starring Jean Simmons and Donald Houston. The screenplay was adapted by John Baines, Michael Hogan, and Frank Launder from the 1908 novel The Blue Lagoon by Henry De Vere Stacpoole. The original music score was composed by Clifton Parker and the cinematography was by Geoffrey Unsworth.

The film tells the story of two young children shipwrecked on a tropical island paradise in the South Pacific. Emotional feelings and physical changes arise as they grow to maturity and fall in love. The film has major thematic similarities to the Biblical account about Adam and Eve.

Plot
In 1841, 8-year-old Emmeline Foster and 10-year-old Michael Reynolds, two British children, are the survivors of a shipwreck in the South Pacific. After days afloat, they are marooned on a lush tropical island in the company of kindly old sailor Paddy Button. Eventually, Paddy dies in a drunken binge, leaving Emmeline and Michael alone. They survive solely on their resourcefulness and the bounty of their remote paradise.

Eight years later, in 1849, the now-adult couple live together in the island paradise, fish, and collect "beads" from the shellfish in the surrounding lagoon. One day, a ship arrives carrying Doctor Murdoch and James Carter, two British men, who are intimated to have fled as criminals from civilization. Surprised to find the couple on the island, Doctor Murdoch soon realizes that Michael collects valuable pearls without knowing their true worth. While Murdoch attempts to trick Michael into getting him a bounty of pearls, Carter tries to kidnap Emmeline and escape. Murdoch and Carter kill each other on the boat, and Michael and Emmeline vow to never attempt to leave the island again. They marry, and during a tropical storm, a child, Paddy, is born.

In 1852, Emmeline is reminded of the outside world and wants to leave the island. She fears for their child if Michael and she should die. Michael gives in to her pleading and they pack a small boat and leave the island. Becalmed in mid-ocean, they succumb to exposure. They are found by a British ship, but the film leaves their fate ambiguous, showing only that Paddy remains alive in the small boat.

Cast
 Jean Simmons as Emmeline Foster
 Donald Houston as Michael Reynolds
 Susan Stranks as Emmeline (younger)
 Peter Rudolph Jones as Michael (younger)
 Noel Purcell as Paddy Button
 James Hayter as Dr. Murdock
 Cyril Cusack as James Carter
 Nora Nicholson as Mrs. Stannard
 Maurice Denham as Ship's Captain
 Philip Stainton as Mr. Ansty
 Patrick Barr as Second Mate
 Lyn Evans as Trotter
 Russell Waters as Craggs
 John Boxer as Nick Corbett
 Bill Raymond as Marsden

Production history
The film was an adaptation of a novel that had been filmed in 1923, but it was the first notable adaptation.

Herbert Wilcox bought the rights to the novel in 1935, as part of his slate of films in production. It was going to be shot in color in Honolulu.

He did not make the film, though, and sold the rights to Gainsborough Pictures at the recommendation of Frank Launder, who always admired the novel. Gainsborough announced the film in 1938 as part of a slate of 10 films. The stars were to be Michael Redgrave and Margaret Lockwood, who had just appeared in Gainsborough's The Lady Vanishes; Will Fyffe was to co-star. In 1939, Gainsborough went into a co-production with 20th Century Fox and Lockwood was going to co-star with Richard Greene, under contract to Fox. Plans to make the film were postponed due to the war.

The project was reactivated after the war and announced in 1946 with Frank Launder attached to direct. Extensive location searches were undertaken before deciding to make the film in Fiji.

Plans to make the film were postponed due to Britain's currency difficulties, but eventually plans were reactivated.

The evil traders were borrowed from the second sequel to the source novel for this film and are not part of the original novel.

Casting
Jean Simmons was attached to the project at an early stage, due to her success in Great Expectations (1946).

Donald Houston was selected as the male lead over 5,000 applicants, 100 of whom were screen-tested.

Filming
The film was shot on location in Fiji, Yasawa Islands, and at Pinewood Studios, Iver Heath, Buckinghamshire, England.

In December, a light plane carrying Leslie Gilliat, the producer and brother of Sidney Gilliat, crashed into a river near Suva. Both Gilliat and the pilot escaped unharmed.

Simmons left England in November, spent some time in Australia, and then travelled to Fiji. Some doubt arose that she would be allowed into Fiji, as she was only 18 and the Fijian colonial regime was contemplating a ban on people under 19 into the country as a precaution against polio being introduced.

Huston and Simmons narrowly escaped injury in Fiji when their car overturned.

The bulk of filming in Fiji took place on the Yasawa Islands. Storms caused shooting to take three months.

Reception
The Blue Lagoon was the seventh-most popular film at the British box office in 1949. According to Kinematograph Weekly, the 'biggest winner' at the box office in 1949 Britain was The Third Man with "runners up" being Johnny Belinda, The Secret Life of Walter Mitty, The Paleface, Scott of the Antarctic, The Blue Lagoon, Maytime in Mayfair, Easter Parade, Red River, and You Can't Sleep Here.

It made a profit of £40,300. Most of the film's earnings came from abroad.

Other versions and sequel
 The novel was adapted into a motion picture by a Hollywood studio (Columbia Pictures) for the first time in a version that was released in 1980 starring Brooke Shields and Christopher Atkins. The updated version, directed by Randal Kleiser, included nudity and sexual content, although not as much as the book. According to Kleiser himself, it was the book and not the 1949 film that inspired his version of the story. That version was followed in 1991 by the sequel Return to the Blue Lagoon, starring Milla Jovovich and Brian Krause. Although the sequel bears a strong similarity to the 1980 film, it bears little resemblance to Stacpoole's second novel, The Garden of God. The pearl-greedy traders do not appear in Stacpoole's original novel, but in the third novel, The Gates of Morning, a pair of sailors attack the people of a nearby island for pearls after seeing a woman wearing a double pearl hair ornament, as Emmeline does in the 1949 film.
 A "contemporary remake" of The Blue Lagoon was made for television in 2012. Called Blue Lagoon: The Awakening, it depicts two teenagers Emmaline Robinson (Indiana Evans) and Dean McCullen (Brenton Thwaites) being stranded on a tropical island. The male lead from the 1980 film, Christopher Atkins, appears in this film as one of the teachers on the shipborne field trip where Emma and Dean are lost at sea and end up on an island.

See also
 State of nature

References

External links
 
 
 
 
 Review of film at Variety

1949 films
1940s adventure drama films
1949 romantic drama films
British adventure films
British romantic drama films
Films about children
Films about survivors of seafaring accidents or incidents
Films based on British novels
Films based on romance novels
Films based on works by Henry De Vere Stacpoole
Films directed by Frank Launder
Films scored by Clifton Parker
Films set in Oceania
Films shot at Pinewood Studios
Films shot in Fiji
Romantic period films
Films with screenplays by Frank Launder and Sidney Gilliat
Universal Pictures films
Films set in the 1840s
Films set in 1841
Films set in 1849
Films set in the 1850s
Films set in 1852
Films set in the Victorian era
Films set on uninhabited islands
Juvenile sexuality in films
1940s British films